The 2018 FFAS Women's National League was the fourteenth season of the FFAS Women's National League, the top football league of American Samoa in women's football. The competition began on 15 September 2018 and finished on 5 December 2018. Ilaoa & To'omata won their first league title.

League table

Playoffs 

Semi-finals

Third place playoff

Final

References 

American Samoa
American Samoa